Led Zeppelin's 1973 European Tour was a concert tour of Europe by the English rock band. The tour commenced on 2 March and concluded on 2 April 1973.

This tour began four weeks after Led Zeppelin's previous tour of the United Kingdom. It is notable for the crowd violence which occurred at some shows, with concerts at Marseille and Lille being canceled as a result of riots by fans which had taken place at the band's earlier performances in France.

Some critics consider Led Zeppelin to have been at their technical peak during this tour, which took place shortly before the release of their fifth album. Several tracks from this album were performed on the tour, namely "Over the Hills and Far Away", "Dancing Days", "The Song Remains the Same", "The Rain Song" and "The Ocean".

Tour set list
The fairly typical set list for the tour was:

"Rock and Roll" (Page, Plant, Jones, Bonham)
"Over the Hills and Far Away" (Page, Plant)
"Out on the Tiles" (intro) (Page, Plant, Bonham) / "Black Dog" (Page, Plant, Jones)
"Misty Mountain Hop" (Jones, Page, Plant)
"Since I've Been Loving You" (Page, Plant, Jones)
"Dancing Days" (Page, Plant)
"Bron-Yr-Aur Stomp" (Page, Plant, Jones)
"The Song Remains the Same" (Page, Plant)
"The Rain Song" (Page, Plant)
"Dazed and Confused" (Page)
"Stairway to Heaven" (Page, Plant)
"Whole Lotta Love" (Bonham, Dixon, Jones, Page, Plant)
Encores (variations of the following list):
"Heartbreaker" (Bonham, Page, Plant)
"The Ocean" (Bonham, Jones, Page, Plant) (Played on 6 and 21 March)
"What Is and What Should Never Be" (Page, Plant) (on 11 March only)

There were some set list substitutions, variations, and order switches during the tour.

Tour dates

External links
Comprehensive archive of known concert appearances by Led Zeppelin (official website)
Led Zeppelin concert setlists

References

Led Zeppelin concert tours
1973 concert tours
1973 in Europe